Alexander Frame Lithgow (1 December 1870 in Glasgow – 12 July 1929 in Launceston, Tasmania) was a Scottish-born, New Zealand and Australian based composer and bandleader known as the "Sousa of the Antipodes".
His name is pronounced "Alek" by his family.

Youth
In 1876, the Lithgows emigrated to Invercargill, New Zealand.  Aged 6, Alex went to Invercargill Grammar School (now Invercargill Middle School). He attended Invercargill's Presbyterian Church, First Church. He liked Ice Hockey, the Circus and Rugby. His family was musical, performing as the six-member Lithgow Concert Company around Southland.

1881 At the age of 11 having had lessons on the cornet initially by his father, Alex joined the local brass band the Invercargill Garrison Band. Alex also learnt the violin to a very high standard.

1886 At the age of 16 he advanced to be the band's solo and principal cornetist. However, despite often being stated, he never was this Band's conductor.

1887 At the age of 17 his first composition, 'Wairoa', was published. This was named after a ship at the band was playing on at the Invercargill estuary.

Early adulthood
Alex played for the Star Rugby football club in Invercargill.

Alex played with the Theatre Royal orchestra as first violin. 
He won national solo cornet titles for the next few years.

1893 At the age of 23 he toured New Zealand as a professional soloist.

Move to Australia
1894 Aged 24 he left New Zealand and moved to Australia where became conductor of the St Joseph's Total Abstinence Society Band in Launceston Tasmania. He earned his living as a compositor at The Examiner and the Daily Telegraph.

1900 Alex aged 30 married Elizabeth Hill Telfer at a Presbyterian church at Launceston on 6 June.

1901 He came back briefly to New Zealand to conduct the Woolston Band at Christchurch where at a charity concert the band performed an entire concert of his compositions.

1903 He went back to Launceston St Joseph's Band.

1904 At the age 34 he started the Australian Army's 12th Battalion Launceston Regiment Band.

1909 He spent his time conducting and being a spontaneous composer for the silent film orchestra at the Lyceum and Princess Theatres.

Later life
1922 He returned to the St Joseph's band for the last time.

1923 He founded and conducted the Launceston Concert Orchestra where he presented many of his compositions plus symphonic jazz. There were more charity all-Lithgow compositions concerts.

1927 at the age of 57 he retired from work and the Band due to ill health.

His marches were published throughout the world and the Americans acclaimed him as 'the Sousa of the Antipodes'.  Lithgow produced approximately two hundred marches, as well as numerous pieces for band, orchestra, piano and voice.  He acquired no copyrights and many of his pieces, in his immaculate notation, were lost or unpublished. Music dominated his existence, but time for composing was scarce when after a long day's work he cycled home to change for an evening performance or a musical gathering.

He died on June 12, 1929 at the age of 59 a few months short of his 60th birthday Lithgow died of a Stroke at Launceston. At his funeral massed bands played The 'Invercargill'.  He is buried in Carr Villa cemetery. He was survived by his wife, son and two daughters. One of the granddaughters Pat Ward wrote a book on him. In 1953 a memorial plaque was unveiled at Paterson Street Barracks and a Band Rotunda built in City Park, Launceston. Still today in Tasmania they continue with Lithgow-only concerts. Tasmanians regard him as theirs but to Kiwis he is from Invercargill.

Lithgow wrote the 'Galvini March' in tribute to his patron B. Galvin, an Australian construction and manufacturing magnate who was a pallbearer at his funeral.

A statue was made of him in 2019 and sits in the heart of Invercargill next to the theater.

Works
Apollo House 
Artillery 
Australia 
Canberra 
Lithgow 
Middlington 
National Guard, The 
New South Wales 
New Zealand 
Queen of the North 
Rauparaha 
Royal Australian Navy
Ryanda 
Sons of Australia 
Southlanders, The 
Stars and Cross 
Sunshine 
Australian Girls – A march
Gallipoli – March – See [ANZAC] day, a national holiday
Hathaway – for Brass Band
Honour the Brave – Slow March
The Courier – for Brass Band
The Vikings – for Brass Band
The skipper – for Brass Band
Brigade of the Guards – For Brass Band
Australian Wedding March
Australia March (tape stored at National Film and Sound Archive, Australia)
The Aboriginal Concert March
New South Wales March
Southstralia 
Westralia March
Westbury March
Gippsland
Wallabies March (National Film & Sound Archive, Australia)
The boomerang
Sons of Australia
Sons of New Zealand
Kia Ora March
Rauparaha March
New Zealand March
City of Ballarat (National Film & Sound Archive, Australia)
Fighting Mac.
Ryanda. 
Stars and cross. 
Tasma. 
Sons of Australia. 
Victoria March. 
Middlington. 
Canberra. 
Artillery. 
Evandale
Cuckoos.
1887 Wairoa, for brass band
1894 The Cataract, for brass band – named for Cataract Gorge, Launceston
1900 Australis, for cornet
1901 Invercargill March, for brass band, also arranged for piano
1901 Le Cirque – Fantasia
1911 Gippsland, for brass band 
1916 March of the [ANZAC] (Australian & New Zealand Armed Corps)
1917 Land of Moa, for brass band
1917 Sons of Australia march 
1917 The Wallabies – named after a recruitment march by volunteers through queensland and new south wales, re-formed as a military unit. Also arranged for pianolla roll (?Author)
1917 Vera – a waltz
1918 Pozieres – A major battle of the great war
1920 Sons of New Zealand 
1922 Scotch Collegians
1925 Queen of the South – March
1926 Australia to-day – depicting the triumphal march of industry
1926 Evandale, for brass band
1928 Haeremai, for brass band 
1928 Home Vale, for brass band
1928 Osborne, for brass band
1929 Hathaway, for brass band 
1929 Toowoomba, for brass band
Galvini March – arranged for piano. Dedicated to Mr & Mrs B.J.Galvin, who was later pallbearer at his funeral.
A comprehensive list of works in German language

Bibliography
Australian Dictionary of Biography
Lloyd Esler Historian Southland Times
International Military Music Society NZ Branch
Gavin Marriott researcher who gave the tribute to Lithgow at the centenary to The 'Invercargill' March.
Rodney Sutton current Patron of Invercargill Garrison Band & Lithgow historian
St Joe's Big Band Launceston
Ward, Pat, Alex F Lithgow 1870–1929: March Music King (Armadale, W.A.: P. Ward, (c) 1990).
wind repertory Project

1870 births
1929 deaths
Australian male composers
Australian composers
New Zealand composers
Male composers
Australian military musicians